Collector's Series is a 1985 compilation album by country singer Willie Nelson.

Track listing 
All tracks composed by Willie Nelson; except where indicated
"Night Life" (Nelson, Walt Breeland, Paul Buskirk)	 
"Funny How Time Slips Away" 		 
"Crazy Arms" (Ralph Mooney, Chuck Seals)		 
"Healing Hands of Time"  
"Yesterday's Wine" 	 	 
"Today I Started Loving You Again" (Merle Haggard, Bonnie Owens)		 
"Rainy Day Blues" 		 
"San Antonio Rose" (Bob Wills)		 
"Heartaches by the Number" (Harlan Howard)  	 
"Born to Lose" (Frankie Brown, Ted Daffan)	 
"Have I Told You Lately That I Love You" (Scotty Wiseman)	 
"One in a Row" 	 
"Good Hearted Woman" (Nelson, Waylon Jennings) 		 
"Help Me Make It Through the Night" (Kris Kristofferson)

Personnel 
Willie Nelson - Guitar, vocals

1985 compilation albums
Willie Nelson compilation albums